The 2014 South Florida Bulls football team represented the University of South Florida (USF) in the 2014 NCAA Division I FBS football season.  The USF Bulls played their home games at Raymond James Stadium in Tampa, FL. The 2014 college football season was the 18th season overall for the Bulls, and their second season as a member of the American Athletic Conference. They were led by second year head coach Willie Taggart. They finished the season 4–8, 3–5 in AAC play to finish in seventh place.

Schedule

Source:

Roster

Game summaries

Western Carolina

Maryland

NC State

UConn

Wisconsin

East Carolina

Last meeting was the 2006 PapaJohns.com Bowl

Tulsa

Cincinnati

Houston

SMU

Memphis

UCF

References

South Florida
South Florida Bulls football seasons
South Florida Bulls football